"Mon plus beau Noël" is a 2005 song recorded by French singer Johnny Hallyday. It was the second single on his album Ma Vérité on which it features as eighth track, and was released in December 2005 as a Christmas song. It was successful in Belgium (Wallonia), and particularly in France where it was Hallyday's third number-one single.

Song information
The B-side, "Je prendrai soin de vous", was at the time a new song never published. "Mon plus beau Noël" was performed in 2006 at the Palais des Sports of Paris and was also included in a live version on the album Flashback Tour – Palais des Sports 2006, as fifth track of the second CD. The song is also available as B-side on the singer's 2006 single "La Quête" and on his compilation Triple Best Of, released in 2008.

"Mon plus beau Noël" is a tribute to Hallyday's daughter named Jade whom he just adopted and who features on the single cover. A choir of children can be heard in the second refrain, as well as Jade who babbles during the last seconds of the song.

In France, the single debuted at No. 6 on 10 December 2005, then climbed to No. 2, then topped the chart for one week. It kept on dropping the weeks after and totaled seven weeks in the top ten, 11 weeks in the top 50 and 16 weeks on the chart (top 100).

Track listings
 CD single
 "Mon plus beau Noël" – 4:18
 "Je prendrai soin de vous" – 4:59

 Digital download
 "Mon plus beau Noël" – 4:18
 "Mon plus beau Noël" (live) – 4:30

 CD single – Promo
 "Mon plus beau Noël" – 4:18

Credits
 Made in the European Union
 "Mon plus beau Noël" 
 Written by Fred Blondin
 Editions : Pimento Music / Zoé Production
 "Je prendrai soin de vous"
 Written by Pierre Jaconelli
 Editions : WCMF / Daime Editions / Pimento Music

Charts and sales

Peak positions

Year-end charts

Certifications

References

2005 singles
Christmas songs
Johnny Hallyday songs
SNEP Top Singles number-one singles